Elmer Food Beat is a rock group from Nantes, France, formed in 1986. Their work is known for its raunchy lyrics. They were the 1991 Group of the Year for the Victoires de la Musique awards. They also co-created the annual Nantes music festival Les Rockeurs ont du cœur with their first manager, Stéphane Cluzeau.

Members 
 Twistos : Guitar, vocals
 Manou : Vocals
 Grand Lolo : Guitar, vocals (replaced Kelu in 2002)
 Vincent : Drums
 Kalou : Bass guitar

Discography 
 1988 : Elmer Food Beat (Maxi 45T)
 1990 : 30 cm (CD)
 1991 : Je vais encore dormir seul ce soir (CD), XIII Bis Records
 1992 : La vie n'est pas une opérette (CD), XIII Bis Records
 1994 : La Copulation (CD),  XIII Bis Records
 1997 : Heureux sur scène (CD)
 1998 : Gold (CD)
 2000 : Ze disque : 30 cm et plus (CD), XIII Bis Records
 2000 : L'essentiel (CD)
 2002 : Ze Best Of (CD & DVD)
 2010 : 25 cm (CD 6 titres)
 2012 : Merci les filles (Compilation), XIII Bis Records
 2013 : Les Rois du Bord de Mer

References

French rock music groups
Musical groups established in 1986
Musical groups from Pays de la Loire